The name Epsilon has been used for two tropical cyclones in the Atlantic Ocean.

 Hurricane Epsilon (2005), Category 1 hurricane that persisted beyond the official November 30 end date of the hurricane season
 Hurricane Epsilon (2020), late-season Category 3 hurricane that tracked east of Bermuda

Atlantic hurricane set index articles